Jonas Wenström (4 August 1855 in Hällefors – 22 December 1893 in Västerås) was a Swedish engineer and inventor, who in 1890 received a Swedish patent on the same three-phase system independently developed by Mikhail Dolivo-Dobrovolsky. the basis for ASEA (later ABB). 

About the invention of electric light, Wenström wrote: "Edison's new invention of electric light: a glowing carbon strip, is the same thing that I discovered a year ago ... If I had his laboratory, and resources, I would have done the same and better ... a graphite strip between two mica plates provide a more effective light than Edison's."

References

External links  
 

1855 births
1893 deaths
Swedish engineers
19th-century Swedish businesspeople